Leander is a city in Williamson County and Travis County, Texas, United States. The population was 59,202 at the 2020 census and 67,124 at the 2021 census estimate. A suburb just north of Austin, and part of the  metropolitan area, it was the fastest-growing city in the United States between 2018 and 2019.

History

Leander was established in 1882 on land sold by the Austin and Northwestern Railroad Co. to prospective citizens. The town was named in honor of Leander "Catfish" Brown, one of the railroad officials responsible for the completion of the line.

Tumlinson Fort, the first white settlement in Williamson County, was established in early January 1836 at the headwaters of Brushy Creek, 4 miles south of present-day Leander. With the purpose of protecting white settlers from attacks by Comanche Indians, a company of Texas Rangers occupied the post until late February, when the invasion of Santa Anna made it necessary for the post to be abandoned, soon after which it was burned by the Comanche.

The Webster Massacre occurred near present-day Leander in August 1839, when a party of about 30 settlers traveling westward through the area were attacked by Comanche Indians and all but 3 were killed.

It was near Leander that the Leanderthal Lady, a skeleton dating back 10,000 to 13,000 years, was discovered; the site was one of the earliest intact burials found in the United States.

Geography
Leander is located at the intersection of Ranch to Market Road 2243 and US Route 183 about 22 miles northwest of Austin. Georgetown lies 5 miles to the east on Route 2243.

None of the area is covered with water.

Demographics

As of the 2020 United States census, there were 59,202 people, 18,505 households, and 15,118 families residing in the city. The population density was 1,016.2 people per square mile (392.6/km2). There were 2,612 housing units at an average density of 349.4 per square mile (135.0/km2). 51.7% of households had children under the age of 18 living with them, 65.5% were married couples living together, 10.5% had a female householder with no husband present, and 19.0% were non-families. 14.8% of all households were made up of individuals, and 3.6% had someone living alone who was 65 years of age or older. The average household size was 3.01 and the average family size was 3.33.

In the city, the population was spread out, with 33.5% under the age of 18, 7.6% from 18 to 24, 38.6% from 25 to 44, 15.7% from 45 to 64, and 4.6% who were 65 years of age or older. The median age was 30 years. For every 100 females, there were 102.3 males. For every 100 females age 18 and over, there were 96.0 males.

As of 2019, median household income (in 2019 dollars) from 2015 to 2019 was $101,872.  Per capita income in first 12 months of 2021 (in 2019 dollars), 2015–2019 was $36,893, and persons in poverty, was 4.2%.

Education
Leander is the center of the Leander Independent School District. Schools in the district include Leander High School, Vista Ridge High School, Cedar Park High School, Charles Rouse High School, Vandegrift High School, Tom Glenn High School, Wiley Middle School (Bernice Knox Wiley Middle School), Leander Middle School, Danielson Middle School, Henry Middle School, Running Brushy Middle School, Cedar Park Middle School, Canyon Ridge Middle school, Parkside Elementary School, Pleasant Hill Elementary School, Rutledge Elementary School, Whitestone Elementary School, Jim Plain Elementary School, and Block House Creek Elementary School, Winkley Elementary School, Reed Elementary School, Camacho Elementary (S.T.E.M.) school, Bagdad Elementary School and Monta Akin Elementary School.

Infrastructure

Transportation
Leander is a jurisdiction member of the Capital Metropolitan Transportation Authority (Capital Metro). The northern terminus for the Capital MetroRail Red Line is located at Leander Station and Park & Ride designed by McKinney York Architects, located on U.S. Highway 183 north of Ranch to Market Road 2243. Leander Station also has access to several express bus lines, and includes a park and ride facility with 600 parking spaces.

Notable people

 Nate Champion, notable in the Johnson County War
 Dan Janjigian, Olympian, author and management consultant
 Khiry Shelton, Professional Soccer player, MLS Soccer, Sporting KC Professional Soccer Club
 Paul Thompson, football player

References

External links
 City of Leander
 Leander Chamber of Commerce
 

 
Cities in Texas
Cities in Williamson County, Texas
Cities in Travis County, Texas
Cities in Greater Austin
1882 establishments in Texas